Branislav Vukomanović  (born December 29, 1981) is a Serbian former footballer and current coach.

Playing career
Vukomanović began his career in 2000 in the First League of FR Yugoslavia with FK Radnički Kragujevac. In 2001, he played with FK Šumadija 1903 and the following season he played abroad in the Montenegrin First League with FK Zeta. During his tenure with FK Zeta he featured in the 2006 UEFA Intertoto Cup against NK Maribor. In 2006, he went to play in the Corgoň Liga with FC Petržalka akadémia. The following season he went further north to sign with Syrianska FC in the Division 1.

After a brief stint in the Serbian League West with Radnicki he played in Liga I with FC Farul Constanța. He returned to the Serbia in 2010 to play with FK Šumadija Radnički 1923. In 2010, he played in the Premier League of Bosnia and Herzegovina with FK Sloboda Tuzla. He went abroad once more in 2011 to sign with Szolnoki MÁV FC in the Nemzeti Bajnokság I. In 2011, he returned to the Serbian SuperLiga to play with FK Metalac Gornji Milanovac.

He had a brief stint abroad in the Albanian Superliga with KS Kastrioti. He returned to Serbia to play with FK Radnički Niš. In 2013, he went overseas to play with London City in the Canadian Soccer League. In his debut season he assisted the club by clinching a postseason berth, and featured in the quarterfinal match against York Region Shooters. In 2014, he was transferred to the Serbian White Eagles, where he won the CSL Championship in 2016.

Managerial career
In 2017, he served as an assistant coach for the Serbian White Eagles in the Canadian Soccer League. In 2019, he along with Uroš Stamatović became involved with the Serbian White Eagles academy as a manager and coach.

Honors
Serbian White Eagles
 CSL Championship: 2016

References

1981 births
Living people
Sportspeople from Kragujevac
Serbian footballers
Serbian football managers 
Serbian expatriate footballers
Association football defenders
FK Zeta players
Syrianska FC players
Expatriate footballers in Sweden
FCV Farul Constanța players
Liga I players
Expatriate footballers in Romania
FC Petržalka players
Slovak Super Liga players
Expatriate footballers in Slovakia
FK Radnički 1923 players
FK Radnički Niš players
FK Metalac Gornji Milanovac players
Serbian SuperLiga players
FK Sloboda Tuzla players
Szolnoki MÁV FC footballers
Expatriate footballers in Hungary
KS Kastrioti players
Kategoria Superiore players
Expatriate footballers in Albania
Serbian White Eagles FC players
Serbian White Eagles FC non-playing staff
Canadian Soccer League (1998–present) players
Expatriate soccer players in Canada
London City players
First League of Serbia and Montenegro players
Nemzeti Bajnokság I players
Montenegrin First League players
Premier League of Bosnia and Herzegovina players
Serbian League players